Colsyrnola brunnea is a species of sea snail, a marine gastropod mollusk in the family Pyramidellidae, the pyrams and their allies.

Description
The light brown, shining shell has an elongate-conic shape. The length of the shell measures 17.6 mm. The 2½  whorls of the protoconch are small and polished, and have a depressed helicoid shape. Their axis is at a right angle to the axis of the later whorls and about one-sixth immersed in the first of them. The sixteen whorls of the teleoconch are flattened, slightly shouldered, and rather low between the sutures. They are marked only by lines of growth and microscopic spiral striae. The sutures are subchanneled and minutely crenulated. The periphery and the base of body whorl are well rounded. They are marked like the spaces between the sutures. The aperture is suboval. The posterior angle is acute. The outer lip is thin. The columella is short, somewhat twisted and revolute. It bears a strong oblique fold a little anterior to its insertion. The parietal wall is covered by a thin callus.

Distribution
This marine species occurs off Japan.

References

 Okutani T., ed. (2000) Marine mollusks in Japan. Tokai University Press. 1173 pp. page(s): 707

External links
 To World Register of Marine Species

Pyramidellidae
Gastropods described in 1854